The deep cervical lymph nodes are a group of cervical lymph nodes found near the internal jugular vein in the neck.

Structure 
The deep cervical lymph nodes can be divided into upper and lower groups, or superior and inferior groups.

Alternatively, they can be divided into deep anterior cervical lymph nodes and deep lateral cervical lymph nodes.

They can also be divided into three groups: "superior deep jugular", "middle deep jugular", and "inferior deep jugular".

Location 
The deep cervical lymph nodes are contained in the carotid sheath in the neck, close to the internal jugular vein. They connect to the meningeal lymphatic vessels superiorly.

Function 
The deep cervical lymph nodes provide lymphatic drainage to many parts of the head, including the pharynx, mouth, and meninges.

References 

Lymphatics of the head and neck